Alan Irvine Barr (15 September 1912 – 30 October 1973) was a South African cricketer who played nine first-class matches for Orange Free State from 1930 to 1937.

Barr was born in Quthing, in what is now Lesotho (previously part of the British colony of Basutoland). He is one of only a handful of first-class cricketers to be born in that country. Barr made his first-class debut at 17, playing against Natal during the 1929–30 season of the Currie Cup. He continued making regular appearances for Orange Free State until the 1937–38 season, but never played more than two matches in a single season. Barr's highest first-class score was an innings of 43 against Eastern Province in February 1937, made from third in the batting order. He finished his career with a batting average of only 14.56, and never bowled at first-class level. Barr died in October 1973 in Ficksburg, which lies on the border between Lesotho and Orange Free State Province.

Notes

References

1912 births
1973 deaths
Free State cricketers
Lesotho cricketers
South African cricketers
People from Quthing District
Lesotho emigrants to South Africa